Coenred (sometimes given as Cenred or Kenred) was king of Northumbria from 716 to 718.

Life
He descended from Ida of Bernicia, and was the first of his branch of the family to rule Northumbria.
John of Fordun claims that he murdered his predecessor Osred. Bede merely mentions that Osred was slain; the Anglo-Saxon Chronicle places it somewhere "on the southern border". William of Malmesbury calls him "a draught from the same cup" as Osred, which is to say a young man, vigorous, dissolute, cruel and bold.

Ceolwulf claimed descent from Ida of Bernicia. "Ceolwulf was the son of Cutha, Cutha of Cuthwin, Cuthwin of Leoldwald, Leoldwald of Egwald, Egwald of Aldhelm, Aldhelm of Ocga, Ocga of Ida, Ida of Eoppa." 

The manner of his death is unknown. The Annals of Ulster record the death of the son of Cuidine (Cuthwine), king of the Saxons, in 718, and this almost certainly refers to Coenred. He was succeeded by  Osric, brother, or half-brother, of Osred. Coenred's brother Ceolwulf became king after Osric.

References

Further reading
 Higham, N.J., The Kingdom of Northumbria AD 350-1100. Stroud: Sutton, 1993. 
 Marsden, J., Northanhymbre Saga: The History of the Anglo-Saxon Kings of Northumbria. London: Cathie, 1992. 
 Plummer, Charles, Venerabilis Baedae Opera Historica. Volume 2. Oxford: Clarendon Press, 1896, page 340.

External links 
 

718 deaths
Northumbrian monarchs
8th-century English monarchs
Year of birth unknown
Idings

de:Coenred